The 2005 Major League Lacrosse season was the fifth season of the league. The season began on May 20 and concluded with the championship game on August 21, 2005. This was the last MLL season when they just had 6 teams, and the next season, they had the new Western Conference.

General information
The 45 second shot clock was changed to a 60-second shot clock in 2005.

Baltimore defeated New Jersey 21-12 in a game played at Qwest Field in Seattle on May 28.

Regular season
W = Wins, L = Losses, PCT= Winning Percentage, PF= Points For, PA = Points Against

Long Island defeated Philadelphia 2 of 3 games in the regular season.

All Star Game
July 2, 2005
Young Guns 21-20(OT) Old School at INVESCO Field at Mile High, Denver, Colorado, Michael Powell MVP

Old School team was made up of players who began playing in 2001. Young Guns was made up of players who began in 2002 or later.

Playoffs

Semifinal games August 19, 2005
Baltimore 20-13 Rochester  @ Nickerson Field, Boston, Massachusetts
Long Island 19-14 Boston  @ Nickerson Field, Boston, Massachusetts

MLL championship August 21, 2005
Baltimore 15-9 Long Island @ Nickerson Field, Boston, Massachusetts

Bracket

Awards

5
Major League Lacrosse